Nuremberg South is an electoral constituency (German: Wahlkreis) represented in the Bundestag. It elects one member via first-past-the-post voting. Under the current constituency numbering system, it is designated as constituency 245. It is located in northern Bavaria, comprising the southern part of the city of Nuremberg and the city of Schwabach.

Nuremberg South was created for the inaugural 1949 federal election. Since 2009, it has been represented by Michael Frieser of the Christian Social Union (CSU).

Geography
Nuremberg South is located in northern Bavaria. As of the 2021 federal election, it comprises the independent city of Schwabach as well as the Stadtbezirke 14 through 21, 31 through 55, 60 through 63, 96, and 97 from the independent city of Nuremberg.

History
Nuremberg South was created in 1949, then known as Nürnberg. It acquired its current name in the 1965 election. In the 1949 election, it was Bavaria constituency 32 in the numbering system. In the 1953 through 1961 elections, it was number 227. In the 1965 through 1998 elections, it was number 231. In the 2002 and 2005 elections, it was number 246. Since the 2009 election, it has been number 245.

Originally, the constituency comprised the independent city of Nuremberg excluding northwestern parts. In the 1965 through 1987 elections, it comprised the southern half of the city of Nuremberg. In the 1990 through 1998 elections, it also contained the independent city of Schwabach. It acquired its current borders in the 2002 election.

Members
The constituency was first represented by Walter Sassnick of the Social Democratic Party (SPD) from 1949 to 1957. Georg Stiller of the Christian Social Union (CSU) won it in 1957 and served one term. Käte Strobel of the SPD was elected in 1961 and served until 1972. He was succeeded by fellow SPD member Egon Lutz from 1972 to 1983. Peter Höffkes of the CSU won the constituency in 1983 and was representative until 1990, followed by Renate Blank from 1990 to 1998. Horst Schmidbauer of the SPD was elected in 1998 and held the constituency until 2002, when former member Blank regained it for the CSU. She served a further two terms. Michael Frieser was elected in 2009, and re-elected in 2013, 2017, and 2021.

Election results

2021 election

2017 election

2013 election

2009 election

References

Federal electoral districts in Bavaria
1949 establishments in West Germany
Constituencies established in 1949
Nuremberg
Schwabach